Asena Serbezova (Cyrillic script: Асена Сербезова, born 30 March 1973) is a Bulgarian pharmacist and university teacher, minister of health under the government of Kiril Petkov from 2021 to 2022.

Biography
In 1996, she graduated in pharmacy from the Medical University of Sofia. She obtained a master's degree in health service organization at her alma mater, health policy and pharmacoeconomics at Pompeu Fabra University and psychology at the Veliko Tarnovo University. Saints Cyril and Methodius. Professionally associated with the pharmaceutical industry, she worked in drug distribution companies and in institutions responsible for clinical trials. As an academic teacher associated with the Medical University of Sofia, where she took a professorship. She was chairman of the quality committee of the Bulgarian pharmaceutical association BFS (2007-2010) and vice-chairman of that organization (2010-2013). From 2014 to 2018, she was the Executive Director of the Medicines Executive Agency at the Minister of Health, and was also a member of the management of the European Medicines Agency. In 2020, elected president of the BFS.

In December 2021, on the recommendation of the group We Continue the Change, she took the position of health minister in the newly formed government of Kiril Petkov.

References

Academic staff of Medical University, Sofia
1973 births
Living people
Health ministers of Bulgaria
Women government ministers of Bulgaria
Women pharmacists